This is a list of equipment used by the Armed Forces of the Republic of Kazakhstan.

Current equipment

Ground forces equipment

Aircraft

Naval equipment

References

Military of Kazakhstan
Kazakhstan